Charles A. Dinarello (born April 22, 1943) is a professor of medicine at the University of Colorado at Denver. He is an expert on inflammatory cytokines, specifically Interleukin 1.

Education and career 
Dinarello received his Doctor of Medicine in 1969 at Yale University and since 1996, he is Professor of Medicine at University of Colorado School of Medicine. He is also Professor of Experimental Medicine at the Radboud University Medical Center in Nijmegen, The Netherlands. Dinarello is considered one of the founding fathers of cytokines having purified and cloned interleukin-1. This important step established the validation of cytokines as mediators of disease, particularly of inflammation. Current studies blocking IL-1 in humans supports Dinarello's and his co-workers pivotal contributions to cytokine biology and the pathogenesis of inflammatory diseases.

He is fluent in English, Italian and German.

Awards
 1993: Ernst Jung Prize
 2006: Hamdan Award for Medical Research Excellence, awarded by Sheikh Hamdan bin Rashid Al Maktoum Award for Medical Sciences, Dubai, United Arab Emirates 
 2009: Crafoord Prize in Polyarthritis (together with Tadamitsu Kishimoto and Toshio Hirano) “for their pioneering work to isolate interleukins, determine their properties and explore their role in the onset of inflammatory diseases”.
 2009: Albany Medical Center Prize (shared with Ralph M. Steinman and Bruce A. Beutler)
 2010: Paul Ehrlich and Ludwig Darmstaedter Prize
 2010: Novartis Prize in Clinical Immunology (together with Juerg Tschopp).
 2011: Foreign membership of the Royal Netherlands Academy of Arts and Sciences
 2020: Tang Prize in Biopharmaceutical Science.

References

External links 

Institutional Website
Information about his research from the Royal Swedish Academy of Sciences

1943 births
Living people
American immunologists
Members of the Royal Netherlands Academy of Arts and Sciences
Members of the United States National Academy of Sciences
University of Colorado Denver faculty
University of Denver faculty